Jakub Stehlík (born October 29, 1990) is a Czech professional ice hockey defenceman. He currently plays with Orli Znojmo in the Austrian Hockey League (EBEL).

He began his career with Orli Znojmo in the EBEL, before Stehlík made his Czech Extraliga debut playing with Piráti Chomutov debut during the 2012–13 Czech Extraliga season.

References

External links

1990 births
Living people
Czech ice hockey defencemen
Orli Znojmo players
Piráti Chomutov players
People from Znojmo
Sportspeople from the South Moravian Region
SK Horácká Slavia Třebíč players
HC Vítkovice players
Sportovní Klub Kadaň players